Art on Ice is a Swiss figure skating gala. It combines performances of the world's best figure skaters with those of international music stars. The gala takes place annually in Zurich's Hallenstadion, in Lausanne at the Patinoire de Malley, in Basel at the St, Jakobshalle, in St. Moritz and in Davos. The event, which is popular among the population, is also broadcast on  television on a time-delayed basis. The event is considered the leading event of its kind in the world.

History 
The show was based on an idea by Oliver Höner and first took place in 1995 under the title World Class Figure Skating in the ice rink in Küsnacht. One year later, Oliver Höner, together with Reto Caviezel, realized the show with live music under the name Art on Ice in the Hallenstadion in Zurich. There, the show is now performed on four evenings in front of around 10,000 spectators each time. Each year, Art on Ice attracts around 80,000 spectators. Art on Ice has been performed abroad several times, for example in China, Japan, Finland and Sweden.

In 2020, Art on Ice could celebrate its 25th anniversary with a big show and famous world stars. The figure skating gala was held  in February before the COVID-19 outbreak in Switzerland. In 2021, the organizers had to abandon the usual shows because of the COVID-19 pandemic. However, the dinner show Art on Ice Special was offered in September 2021 for about 1000 guests. The line-up of stars matched the standard of previous years: Victoria Sinitsina, Nikita Katsalapov, Vanessa James, Eric Radford and Alina Zagitova.

At the end of November 2021, it was announced that Art on Ice would have to postpone their 2022 Swiss tour to 2023. Following the dinner show concept of fall 2021, top class figure skating will still be offered. On March 3, 4 and 5, 2021, three dinner shows Art on Ice Special with international stars for 1000 guests each were held in Zurich's Hallenstadion.

The figure skaters who have performed at Art on Ice so far include:

The list of music stars who have performed for Art on Ice includes:

References

Figure skating in Switzerland
1995 establishments in Switzerland